Performance Channel was an arts and entertainment television channel that broadcast in the United Kingdom, on the Sky Digital platform. Performance Channel launched in 1985 and was an evening cable-only service for many years. The channel started broadcasting on Sky Digital in 2003 and its broadcast hours expanded. The channel was dropped from cable networks shortly afterwards.

Programming
The channel broadcast concerts, performances, master classes and star profiles from noted composers and musicians. Music featured included jazz and easy listening, as well as opera and classical. The channel also featured dance performances as well as interviews with noted actors and performers.

Performance Channel tended to offer more high culture in its schedules, rather than its sister channel Performance MainStreet which concentrated more on rock and pop music programming.

History
Daily Mail & General Trust (DMGT) bought the Performance Channel in 1994 and sold it to Eicom in 2005.

The Performance Channel was closed down at 6.00am on 1 July 2008 after nearly 25 years of broadcasting.

As of 1 July 2008, some of the Performance Channel programmes had moved to its sister channel, Performance MainStreet, until it closed down on 10 September 2008 and was replaced with Rock On TV on 1 October 2008.

References

External links
 Official site (Now inactive)

Television channels in the United Kingdom
Defunct television channels in the United Kingdom
1985 establishments in the United Kingdom
Television channels and stations established in 1985
Television channels and stations disestablished in 2008
1980s in British television
1990s in British television
2000s in British television
History of television in the United Kingdom